Weld Boathouse is a Harvard-owned building on the bank of the Charles River in Cambridge, Massachusetts.  It is named after George Walker Weld, who bequeathed the funds for its construction.

History
Weld Boathouse is the second of two boathouses created at its location on the Charles River near Harvard by George Walker Weld. The first was built in 1889. The second, grander structure was built in 1906 with funds that Weld bequeathed for that purpose.  It is this famous Cambridge landmark, best viewed looking across the Charles from Boston, whose centennial was celebrated in 2006.

Situated at the halfway point of the Head of the Charles course, the Weld Boathouse is just a short walk from Harvard Yard and serves as an integral part of Harvard's athletic landscape.  It is also a favored subject of painters and photographers.

Although previously used for Harvard men's freshmen crew team, Weld Boathouse is currently the home of the heavyweight and lightweight crews of Harvard's varsity women's rowing.  These programs retain the title of Radcliffe Women's Crew, a reminder of the phased merger of Radcliffe College into Harvard University during the latter part of the 20th century. Additionally, Weld Boathouse is home to Harvard's recreational sculling program and the House Crews of Harvard College's twelve residential colleges. Graduate rowing programs also use Weld. Harvard men's rowing uses Newell Boathouse on the Boston side of the river.

Until recent decades, rowing and sculling used finely crafted wooden boats. In that tradition, Weld was home to the hand-carving of a traditional baidarka of the type used by Aleutian hunters.

Anderson Memorial Bridge

Next to the boathouse is the Anderson Memorial Bridge built in 1913 by Weld's niece Isabel Weld Perkins and her husband Larz Anderson.  This bridge was designed with "a high enough arch to admit the passage of all sorts of pleasure craft."  Both the Weld Boathouse and the Anderson Memorial Bridge were funded by heirs to the fortune of 19th century magnate William Fletcher Weld.

See also
Harvard Crimson
List of Charles River boathouses

Notes

References
Harvard Crimson 2/4/1981 "Blaze Burns Weld Boathouse, Causes Little Serious Damage" by Paul Jefferson and Thomas J. Meyer
Harvard Magazine November-December 1998, "The Welds of Harvard Yard" by associate editor Craig A. Lambert
Jamaica Plain Historical Society, "The Weld Family"
Project Gutenberg, Book of Annals and Reminiscences of Jamaica Plain by Harriet Manning Whitcomb

External links

Official website

College rowing venues in the United States
Cultural infrastructure completed in 1889
Cultural infrastructure completed in 1906
Culture of Boston
Harvard University buildings
Harvard Crimson
Landmarks in Cambridge, Massachusetts